Trouble is the debut album of American singer-songwriter Bonnie McKee, released in September 2004. The songs were written when she was aged 14–15, and reflect events in her life at the time. McKee had produced six of these in demo form in 2001, and they were broadcast on Seattle radio stations as well as the National Public Radio network.

McKee had essentially completed the album in New York City with Bob Power as producer, when Reprise asked her to record "Somebody" with Rob Cavallo in California. Pleased with the more layered sound, she decided to re-record all but "January" and "I Hold Her". This delayed the album's release by a year.

Production and release
McKee first recorded her album in New York City with producer Bob Power across eight months. Then she was introduced to producer Rob Cavallo, who served as Reprise artists and repertoire man, and went to Los Angeles with him, first to record  Trouble lead single "Somebody". The result was enough for them to re-record the whole album, taking a whole year in the process.

Reprise was unsure on how to promote McKee, with the singer herself admitting that "I was a teenage rebel rock star-but writing these heartfelt singer/songwriter songs. I was given a dress code because everyone thought I was 'too sexy.' No one knew what to do with me." The label at first considering to showcase her in adult contemporary radio, based on her life history and style influenced by Fiona Apple. To determine how successful this would be, Reprise had a partnership with internet radio website LAUNCHcast, which would include "Somebody" into the adult contemporary playlists, as well as showcasing the song to other listeners. The result had "Somebody" being popular more with a younger audience than the adult females that the label expected, with the song eventually becoming the tenth most played on LAUNCHcast and McKee entering the 50 most searched terms on the website's owner Yahoo!. A new strategy was devised, trying to make McKee appeal to the teen pop demographic while showcasing a subversive attitude. This was illustrated by the album cover with McKee blowing a bubble gum, which the singer describes as "a bit of a play on the bubblegum pop thing, except it looks kind of like a mug shot." The album title was an allusion to McKee's wild life: "'Trouble' was my middle name. It was such a hard time for me. Before I got the deal, I had a very difficult teen life as a drug addict and a runaway." Along with "Somebody", which was  featured on the soundtrack album of Win a Date With Tad Hamilton! (2004).

Reception
Johnny Loftus of AllMusic gave a lukewarm review, saying "McKee's lyrics about adolescent empowerment and the ways of the heart aren't too different from what's already out there. But the songs still share the album's affected quality. It's as if the quirkier arrangements are intended as image builders, designed to add a spunky flair to the tousled, sassy McKee. Pop music doesn't require very much substance -- it's meant to be inviting, familiar, and easily accessible. But while Bonnie McKee's debut features an ultra-modern sound that's been proven successful, its homogenization ends up working against it. Pretty but ultimately empty, Trouble doesn't establish McKee as anything more than another hopeful" Tom Lanham of Paste magazine praised Trouble, which he considered "a great little folk-pop-punk album". MTV would later describe Trouble as "an astonishingly precocious (and criminally underrated) set of soulful pop-rock gems".

However, despite good reviews, the album disappointed commercially, moving fewer than 17,000 copies. McKee was subsequently dropped from Reprise Records. McKee spoke about the album being unsuccessful, saying "It was devastating when the album didn't happen," she said. "I realized there are so many steps from getting a deal to having a hit...and I didn't get there. It was a huge letdown." But reflecting on the album's underperformance considering her eventual success as a songwriter, McKee stated that "had Trouble done what I wanted it to, I may have been caught in Hot AC land forever, which is just not my style."

Track listing

Credits
Bonnie McKee - vocals, keyboards
Paul Bushnell - bass on 2–7, 9, 10
Rob Cavallo - acoustic guitar on 1, 10, 12; electric guitar on 2
Greg Curtis - 3 (Hammond organ) on 4
Dan Chase - Pro Tools on 1–7, 9, 10, 12; programming on 2, 4–7, 12
Luis Conte - percussion on 1, 2
Eric Ferguson - Pro Tools on 5, 6, 10
Bashiri Johnson - percussion on 11
Robbie Kondor - piano on 11
Abe Laboriel Jr. - drums on 2–5, 7, 9, 10
Doug McKean - Pro Tools on 1–7, 9, 10, 12
David McKelvy - harmonica on 2
Tommy Morgan - harmonica on 5
Jamie Muhoberac - keyboards on 1–10
Gary Novak - drums on 5, 6, 10
Tim Pierce - guitars on 1–7, 9, 10, 12
Doug Petty - piano on 8
Bob Power - guitars, keyboards, bass, drums, percussion on 8, 11
Buddy Schaub - horns on 6
Pete Wallewski - horns on 6
Patrick Warren - chamberlin on 4
Emma Kummrow, Igor Szwec, Gloria Justen, Olga Konopelsky, Ghislaine Fleischmann, Gregory Tepperman - violin on 11
Davis Barnett, Peter Nocella - viola on 11
Jennie Lorenzo, James Cooper III - cello on 11

Production
"January" and "I Hold Her":
Producer - Bob Power
Recording - Lindsay Marcus, Bob Power, Blair Wells, David Winslow
Mixing - Dan Chase ("January");  Bob Power, Blair Wells ("I Hold Her")
All other tracks:
Producer - Rob Cavallo
Co-producer - Antonina Armato
Recording - Dan Chase, Doug McKean, Allen Sides
Mixing - Chris Lord-Alge, Tom Lord-Alge

Bonnie McKee: EP 

Bonnie McKee is the debut extended play (EP) of American singer-songwriter Bonnie McKee released in December 2003 by Reprise Records. The EP includes the same tracks of her debut album "Trouble".

Track listing

References

2004 debut albums
Bonnie McKee albums
Albums produced by Rob Cavallo